Arnold Josef Rosé (born Rosenblum; 24 October 1863 – 25 August 1946) was a Romanian-born Austrian Jewish violinist. He was leader of the Vienna Philharmonic Orchestra for over half a century. He worked closely with Brahms. Gustav Mahler was his brother-in-law. Although not known internationally as a soloist he was a great orchestral leader (concertmaster) and player of chamber music, leading the famous Rosé Quartet for several decades.

Early life
Arnold Rosé was born in Iași (Jassy) in what is now Romania. As he and his three brothers showed musical potential the family moved to Vienna, where his father established a thriving business as a carriage builder. Arnold began his musical studies at the age of seven, and at ten entered the first class in violin at the Vienna Conservatory, receiving instruction from Karl Heissler.

Career in Vienna
He made his first appearance in 1879 at a Leipzig Gewandhaus concert, and on 10 April 1881 appeared with the Vienna Philharmonic in the first Viennese performance of Goldmark's violin concerto under Hans Richter. Shortly thereafter he was engaged as solo violinist and leader of the orchestra at the Hoftheater, or Vienna Court Opera (later the Staatsoper). This orchestra, in unique Viennese tradition, played both in the orchestra pit and on the concert platform, and later became known as the Vienna Philharmonic. He remained leader of these two venerable institutions until the 1930s. His reputation as an orchestral leader became legendary. For Sir Adrian Boult, he was quite simply “Europe’s greatest orchestral leader of his time”.  In May 1936, he conducted the VPO Beethoven's Ruinen von Athen overture as the filler side of the three-sided recording of the Leonore Overture No. 3 conducted by Bruno Walter and released on HMV/Gramophone/Gramola/Victor 78s; both performances were both interpreted and played magnificently, as were many other VPO recordings of the period just before the 1938 Anschluss, most notably Walter's equally monumental 1936 readings of Beethoven's Pastoral and Schubert's Unfinished symphonies.

In 1882 he founded the famous Rosé Quartet, regarded as the finest string quartet of its time.  The other members were Hummer (2nd violin), Sigismund Bachrich (viola) and Lohse (cello). 

From 1893 to 1901 Rosé taught at the Vienna conservatory; he rejoined the faculty in 1908 and stayed until 1924. In 1888 Rosé made successful tours through Romania and Germany, and in 1889 was appointed concertmaster at the Bayreuth Festivals. The story is told that during a performance of Wagner’s Die Walküre the orchestra was losing its way and on the verge of breaking down. Rosé stood up and gave a confident lead, bringing the orchestra back together and in tempo. Mahler, who was in the audience, is said to have exclaimed: “Now there IS a concertmaster!” Both Arnold and his brother Eduard, the cellist, were to marry sisters of Mahler (see below).

Mahler moved from Hamburg to Vienna in 1897 to become director of the Vienna Hofoper (later Staatsoper). His sisters Justine and Emma joined him in Vienna a year later. Eduard married Emma that very same month. Justine continued to live with her brother Gustav, keeping house for him. It was not long before a romantic attachment formed between her and Arnold. But it was kept a secret, Justine being unwilling to marry until her brother had found himself a wife. This happened in 1902 when Gustav married Alma Schindler, nearly 20 years his junior. She was considered “the most beautiful girl in Vienna”, and was the daughter of the landscape artist Emil Jakob Schindler. They were married on 9 March 1902, and Arnold and Justine were married the next day.

Persecution and exile
The Rosé family lived in comfortable circumstances. Emperor Franz Josef had guaranteed “freedom of religion and conscience” in 1867, but the reality was often different. They had two children, Alfred (1902-1975), who became a pianist and conductor; and Alma (1906-1944) who was a very successful violinist, but whose career took a tragic turn as she ended up directing an orchestra of prisoners in the Auschwitz-Birkenau concentration camp and eventually died there.

Justine Rosé died on 22 August 1938. Arnold was devastated by her death. Unable to continue living under Nazi occupation, he left Vienna four weeks later and travelled via the Netherlands to England, where he spent the last six years of his life. He continued to play chamber music with Buxbaum and other colleagues. His last appearances were in 1945, so his career stretched over 65 years. After he learned of Alma's death at Birkenau, he found it difficult to continue with his work. He published editions of the violin sonatas of Bach and Beethoven, and of Beethoven's six early Quartets Op 18.

In January 1946, the Vienna Philharmonic "wished to reinstate" Rosé as concertmaster but he refused, saying in February that "56 Nazis remained in the Vienna Philharmonic" - an estimate his son believed to be far too high, but now known to be close to the actual number of 50 (60 had been members during World War II, and after the Allied victory, the orchestra expelled 10 members for their Nazi activities).

Arnold Rosé died in his sleep on August 25, 1946, of heart failure at age 82.

Honours
In 1890 Rosé received the Grosse Goldene Verdienstkreuz from King Ludwig II of Bavaria. On the occasion of his 60th birthday he received the honorary title of “Hofrat” (Court Counsellor) which was a professional rank above “Professor”. He received numerous other awards from the Habsburg, Spanish and Italian courts, the republic of Austria, and the city of Vienna. He was a member of the royal musical establishment with the rank of k.u.k.Hofmusiker (Royal and Imperial Court Musician), and as such he had the privilege of a court carriage to carry him to the opera. He also had his own carriage, with fine livery, which took him to concerts at other venues.

See also
 Alma Rosé
 Alfred Rosé, pianist, conductor

References

Bibliography
 Ehrlich, Celebrated Violinists, pp. 180, 181
 Riemann, Musik-Lexikon

References
 
 JE article
 Rosé, Arnold Joseph on AEIOU Encyclopedia.
 Alma Rosé: “Vienna to Auschwitz” by Richard Newman with Karen Kirtley; Amadeus Press 2000; 
 The New Grove Dictionary of Music & Musicians ed Stanley Sadie;1980; ISBA 1-56159-174-2

 

1863 births
1946 deaths
19th-century Austrian people
20th-century Austrian people
19th-century Romanian people
20th-century Romanian people
19th-century classical violinists
Male classical violinists
20th-century classical violinists
Austrian classical violinists
Romanian classical violinists
Jewish classical musicians
Child classical musicians
Players of the Vienna Philharmonic
Concertmasters
Concertmasters of the Vienna Philharmonic
Moldavian Jews
Austrian Jews
Austrian people of Romanian-Jewish descent
Musicians from Iași
19th-century male musicians